Because diplomatic missions, such as embassies and consulates, may not be entered by the host country without permission (even though they do not enjoy extraterritorial status), persons have from time to time taken refuge from a host-country's national authorities inside the embassy of another country.

See also 

 List of people granted asylum

References 

Diplomatic incidents
Diplomatic missions
History of international relations

Refuge in a diplomatic mission
Diplomatic immunity and protection
Refuge in a diplomatic mission
Right of asylum